Hapoel Ironi Gedera Football Club is an Israeli football club based in Gedera. The club plays in Liga Bet, the fourth tier of the Israeli football league system.

History
The original club was established in 1958 and spent most of its years in the lower tiers of the Israeli football league system, rising, at its best, to Liga Bet, then the third tier, for two seasons in 1959–60 and 1960–61, and for another season, in 1975–76. The original club folded in 1998.

Re-establishment
The club was re-established in 2011 and was placed in the Central division, in which it played since, its best position was 5th, achieved in 2014–15.

Honours
Liga Gimel
 1958–59
 1974–75

External links
Hapoel Ironi Gedera  Israel Football Association

References

Gedera
Gedera
Association football clubs established in 1958
Association football clubs established in 2011
Association football clubs disestablished in 1998
1958 establishments in Israel
2011 establishments in Israel
1998 disestablishments in Israel